Llano is a city in Llano County, Texas, United States. As of 2010, the city population was 3,232. It is the county seat of Llano County.

Geography

Llano is located at  (30.750953, –98.680038).

Demographics

2020 census

As of the 2020 United States census, there were 3,325 people, 1,221 households, and 809 families residing in the city.

2000 census
As of the census of 2000, 3,325 people, 1,353 households, and 880 families resided in the city. The population density was 748.1 people per square mile (289.1/km2). The 1,539 housing units averaged 346.3/sq mi (133.8/km2) in density. The racial makeup of the city was 94.35% White, 0.57% African American, 0.66% Native American, 0.24% Asian, 3.40% from other races, and 0.78% from two or more races. Hispanics or Latinos of any race were 8.90% of the population.

Of the 1,353 households, 28.8% had children under 18 living with them, 48.6% were married couples living together, 12.9% had a female householder with no husband present, and 34.9% were not families. About 31.3% of all households were made up of individuals, and 18.2% had someone living alone who was 65 years of age or older. The average household size was 2.35 and the average family size was 2.95.

In the city, the age distribution was 24.5% under  18, 7.2% from 18 to 24, 23.9% from 25 to 44, 22.4% from 45 to 64, and 22.0% who were 65 or older. The median age was 41 years. For every 100 females, there were 89.9 males. For every 100 females age 18 and over, there were 83.1 males.

The median income for a household in the city was $31,706, and for a family was $38,125. Males had a median income of $29,464 versus $19,958 for females. The per capita income for the city was $16,306. About 7.7% of families and 10.2% of the population were below the poverty line, including 13.8% of those under age 18 and 2.6% of those age 65 or over.

Climate

Llano experiences a humid subtropical climate, with hot summers and generally mild winters. Temperature averages range from 84 °F (29 °C) in the summer to 46 °F (7.8 °C) during winter.

History

Llano County was established in compliance with a February 1, 1856, state legislative act. The Llano River location was chosen in an election held on June 14, 1856, under a live oak on the south bank of the river, near the present site of Roy Inks Bridge in Llano. Into the 1870s, the town was little more than a frontier trading center, with a few log buildings housing business establishments, a post office, and a few homes. In 1879, the first bank, Moore, Foster, and Company, was founded, and during the 1880s, Llano acquired a number of new enterprises that served the county's farmers and ranchers. After the county outgrew the one-story stone building that had housed its public offices, in 1885, an ornate brick courthouse was completed on the square on the south side of the river. A fire on January 22, 1892, destroyed this courthouse; the present county courthouse was completed and occupied on August 1, 1893. It is listed in the National Register of Historic Places.

In the 1880s the Llano Rural, the town's first newspaper, was established, followed by the Iron City News, the name of which reflects growing interest in the county's mineral resources. The Rural eventually incorporated several other newspapers, including the Advocate, the Searchlight, and the Gazette, to become the Llano News by the early 1900s. The Llano Times was where J. Marvin Hunter, author and historian of the American West, worked on the staff for a brief time early in the 20th century.

Anticipation of significant economic growth based on the iron deposits discovered at Iron Mountain in northwestern Llano County attracted capital from Dallas and from northern states, and the boom years of Llano-from 1886 to 1893-were launched. The Llano Improvement and Furnace Company undertook plans for an iron furnace and foundry, and the development of commercial real estate, on the hitherto undeveloped north side of the river. Charters were undertaken for a dam, an electric power plant, a streetcar system, and electric street lights, while expectations of growth were high. Steel-town names such as Birmingham, Pittsburgh, and Bessemer were chosen for streets on the north side; Llano was to be the "Pittsburgh of the West", but only a small dam and the street lighting were completed. By one report, the population reached 7,000 in 1890. In 1892, at the peak of the boom period, the town was incorporated, the river was bridged, and the Austin and Northwestern Railroad was extended to a terminal on the north side of Llano. Because of the improved transportation, several granite-cutting and -finishing businesses moved to town in this period. Many of the new businesses were begun in the boom period, and substantial brick establishments were constructed around the public square on the north side of the river. Among these, the Algona Hotel became a focal point for the town's new social life. It was damaged by a cyclone in 1900, and burned to the ground in 1923. Because the county's mineral resources, with the significant exception of granite, did not exist in commercially exploitable concentrations, the boom period soon faded. Plans to connect Llano with Fredericksburg via an extension of the San Antonio and Aransas Pass Railway were not fulfilled. A series of fires in the early 1890s, probably set to collect insurance on unprofitable properties, destroyed many of the new business establishments. Such fires were so numerous, fire insurance was denied to the town for several years.

Farming, ranching, and the granite industry remained the foundations of the town's economy in the 20th century. In the 1920s, Llano was a major shipping point for cattle; the cotton industry flourished in the county through the 1930s, but declined thereafter into insignificance. Granite quarrying and finishing retained their importance, amounting to a million-dollar-a-year industry by the 1950s. The Roy Inks Bridge, named for a former mayor, was built after a flood crest of 42 feet in 1935 swept away the 1892 structure. By 1964, the town had a new hospital, a post office, school buildings, a community center, a rodeo area, and a golf course, along with a city park and improved water system. Llano was an important link in the Highland Lakes chain of tourist areas, and attracted many hunters during the deer season. A winery, feed processing, and insecticide and commercial talc production represented new industry. Actress Sophia Loren, friend and correspondent of the Netherlands native Anthony Goossens, priest of Holy Trinity Catholic Church in Llano, contributed to the church fund-raising campaign in 1975. By 1983, the National Register of Historic Places listed, in addition to the courthouse, the Llano jail, the Southern Hotel, and the Badu Building, former bank and home of French immigrant and mineralogist N. J. Badu, now a bed-and-breakfast establishment.

In 2021 County Judge Ron Cunningham removed books, such as In the Night Kitchen, from the shelves of the main library because they contained nudity. He also ordered librarians to pause buying new material and to purge any other books containing nudity. County commissioners dissolved the library board in 2022. The replacement board voted unanimously to close its meetings to the public to prevent observers from taking notes on the meetings. It removed more books, including Caste: The Origins of Our Discontents.

2018 flood

In October 2018, Llano experienced heavy rainfall and flooding following Hurricane Sergio. The body of an unidentified woman was found on the banks alongside the Colorado River following the flooding in Llano.

Registered historical places

Badu Building

Llano County Courthouse and Red Top Jail

Southern Hotel

Llano County Museum

The Llano County Museum is located in the former Bruhl's Drugstore owned by German native Louis Herman Bruhl (1849–1931). Bruhl married the former Leonie Julia Hammale, a merchant and pharmacist. They first lived in Waco and Rockport. Bruhl was U.S. consul to Italy from 1894 to 1899, and then opened the drugstore in Llano. Their son, Lawrence Lee Bruhl (1905–1999), was a Llano attorney.

The museum, located on the north end of the Llano River bridge, has exhibits on local history, including a chuckwagon, drug store artifacts, and an outdoor frontier cabin. Also, it has  a collection on 1930s world polo player and Llano native Cecil Smith (February 14, 1904 – January 21, 1999), later of Kendall County.

Adjacent to the museum is the Historic Railyard District in which a train depot hosts a railroad museum and visitor's center.

Education
The City of Llano is served by the Llano Independent School District, which includes Packsaddle Elementary, Llano Elementary, Llano Junior High, and Llano High School. Llano's mascot is the Yellow Jacket and the school colors are orange and black. The Llano Independent School District serves about 1,900 students, and is currently a part of District-13AAAA, also including Wimberly, Austin Eastside Memorial, Bandera, Cuero, and Navarro.

Recreation

Hunting
Llano is widely known as the Deer Capital of Texas. The density of white-tailed deer in the Llano Basin is the highest in the nation. Hunters from all over come to Llano for deer, quail, dove, feral pig, and turkey hunting, using guns or bows.

Fishing
The spring-fed Llano River, which runs through the city, offers some of the best fishing in the area, and has become well known to fly anglers throughout Texas. The eastern border of Llano County features three of the Texas Highland Lakes, including Lake Buchanan, Inks Lake, and Lake LBJ. Today, white bass, striped bass, largemouth bass, catfish, spotted bass, crappie, and Guadalupe bass attract fisherman to these lakes year round.

Birding
The bald eagle makes its home in Llano County during its annual winter migration with most birds found around the Lake Buchanan area.

Golf
The Llano River Golf Course is located two miles (3 km) west of the Llano Courthouse on the Ranch Road 152, adjacent to Robinson City Park. The 18-hole golf is located on the banks of the Llano River. A fully equipped pro shop and golf carts are also available.

Geology and archaeology
Llanite, a rare type of brown rhyolite porphyry with sky-blue quartz crystals and rusty-pink microcline feldspar, is found nowhere else in the world except in Llano County. The largest piece of polished llanite in the world can be seen at the Badu House.

The centuries-long habitation of various Native American tribes in the area has produced numerous archaeological sites which attract amateur archaeologists year-round.

An extensive exhibit of artifacts, both Native American and early Texan, and a large display of area gems and minerals are on permanent exhibition at the Llano County Museum.

Notable people

 W. C. Jameson, author, treasure hunter, musician, singer, songwriter, actor, is a resident of Llano

Media

Newspaper
The Llano News

Radio
KVHL/91.7: Public radio
KJFK-FM/96.3: adult hits
KITY/102.9: Oldies

See also
 	

 Central Texas Electric Cooperative
 Geology of Texas
 Llano Municipal Airport

References

External links

 City of Llano website
 Llano MainStreet
 Llano River Golf Course
 Llano Memorial Hospital
 Llano Chamber of Commerce
 
 The Llano News
 The Llano County Journal newspaper
 Badu House
 Llano, TX Courthouse Fire, Dec 1951

Cities in Texas
Cities in Llano County, Texas
County seats in Texas
Populated places established in 1856